Justitia is Lady Justice, an allegorical personification of the moral force in judicial systems.

Justitia may also refer to:

 Justitia (crustacean), a crustacean genus
 269 Justitia, an asteroid
 HMS Justitia, the name of four ships of the Royal Navy
 Polish Judges Association "Iustitia"

See also
Justicia (disambiguation)